The Bayer designation υ Hydrae (Latinised to Upsilon Hydrae; abbreviated υ Hya, Ups Hya) is shared by two stars in the constellation of Hydra:
υ1 Hydrae (also named Zhang)
υ2 Hydrae

Hydrae, Upsilon
Hydra (constellation)